This is a list of equipment used by the Burkina Faso Armed Forces.

Firearms

Vehicles

Artillery

Air Defense

References 

 
Burkina Faso